Dinosaur Wars is a documentary film created by PBS as an episode for American Experience. The video details the rivalry between Edward Cope and O. C. Marsh. Cope and Marsh were paleontologists who uncovered dinosaur fossils in the late 19th century. The episode had been broadcast by PBS in January 2011. PBS later posted the video online in July 2011. The episode has been covered in online articles posted by Technorati and Wired.

References

2011 television films
2011 films
American television films
American Experience
2010s English-language films